In linear algebra, similarity invariance is a property exhibited by a function whose value is unchanged under similarities of its domain.  That is,  is invariant under similarities if  where  is a matrix similar to A.  Examples of such functions include the trace, determinant, characteristic polynomial, and the minimal polynomial.

A more colloquial phrase that means the same thing as similarity invariance is "basis independence", since a matrix can be regarded as a linear operator, written in a certain basis, and the same operator in a new basis is related to one in the old basis by the conjugation , where  is the transformation matrix to the new basis.

See also 
 Invariant (mathematics)
 Gauge invariance
 Trace diagram

Functions and mappings